The 2017 FC Vorkuta season was the first season in the club's participation in the Canadian Soccer League. The club made its professional debut on May 27, 2017 in a home match against Milton SC, which resulted in a 7-0 victory with goals coming from Oleh Kerchu, Danylo Lazar, Oleg Shutov, Vadym Gostiev, and Yaroslav Svorak. The season concluded with Vorkuta clinching the regular season title in their debut season. In the postseason they achieved a victory in the preliminary round, but were eliminated from the competition in the semifinals.

Summary 
After nine years of competition at the senior amateur level FC Vorkuta made the transition to the professional ranks in 2017 by becoming a member in the Canadian Soccer League. In preparation for the 2017 CSL season the team hired the services of Serhiy Zayets as head coach. Zayets assembled a roster with several key CSL veterans acquired primarily from FC Ukraine United. The acquisitions included Sergiy Ivliev, Oleg Shutov, Mykhailo Bulkin, Vitaliy Dnistryan, Danylo Lazar, Vadym Gostiev, and Oleh Kerchu was named the team captain. In addition to the CSL veterans several imports were brought in from Ukraine and Russia to further strengthen the roster.

Vorkuta also fielded a reserve squad in the CSL Second Division. In the earlier stages of the season the club achieved an eight-game undefeated streak with only two defeats throughout the season. They concluded the season by clinching the regular season title with the highest offensive record. Their playoff campaign commenced with an early victory over Royal Toronto FC, but were eliminated from the competition after a 1-0 defeat to Scarborough SC.

Roster

Players

Canadian Soccer League

First Division

League table

Results summary

Results by round

Matches

Second Division

League table

Results summary

Results by round

Statistics

Goals and assists 
Correct as of November 2, 2017

References 

FC Vorkuta seasons
FC Vorkuta
FC Vorkuta